The following is a list of broadcasters for NASCAR on NBC.

Current staff
These are the broadcasters for NASCAR on NBC in 2022.

NASCAR Cup Series

Booth announcers
 Rick Allen (lap-by-lap, all races except New Hampshire and Michigan)
 Steve Letarte (color commentator, all races except Phoenix)
 Jeff Burton (color commentator)
 Dale Earnhardt Jr. (color commentator)
 Mike Bagley (commentator for radio-style broadcasts at the road course races)

Notes: 
 Since Earnhardt Jr. joined NBC as an additional color commentator in 2018, the booth announcers have commentated each race in two booths (any combination of 2 and 2) instead of all 4 of them together in 1 booth. The two booths are next to each other at the track in the grandstands. In 2021 and 2022, Allen and Letarte were together in 1 booth with Burton and Earnhardt Jr. in another booth.

Pit reporters
 Dave Burns
 Kim Coon
 Parker Kligerman
 Marty Snider
 Dillon Welch

Note: NBC usually has 3 or 4 pit reporters per Cup race and 2 or 3 per Xfinity race. All 5 of them take turns, and the pit reporters that aren't on the broadcast are usually pit reporting for an IndyCar race for NBC or IMSA race if there is one on the same day and/or weekend.

Cityview reporter
 Rutledge Wood (select races)

Pre and post-race show
 Marty Snider (host)
 Dale Jarrett (rotating analyst)
 Kyle Petty (rotating analyst)
 Brad Daugherty (rotating analyst starting at Michigan in 2020 and 2021)

NASCAR Xfinity Series

Booth announcers
 Rick Allen (lap-by-lap, most races)
 Dave Burns (lap–by–lap at Darlington) 
 Steve Letarte (color commentator, most races)
 Jeff Burton (color commentator, most races)
 Dale Earnhardt Jr. (color commentator, most races)
 Mike Bagley (commentator for radio-style broadcasts at the road course races)
 Brad Daugherty (alternate color commentator)
 James Hinchcliffe (alternate color commentator)
 Dale Jarrett (alternate color commentator)

Pit reporters
 Dave Burns
 Kim Coon
 Parker Kligerman
 Marty Snider
 Dillon Welch

Pre and post-race show
 Marty Snider (host)
 Dale Jarrett (rotating analyst)
 Kyle Petty (rotating analyst)
 Brad Daugherty (rotating analyst)

Notes:
 NBC usually has 3 or 4 pit reporters per Cup race and 2 or 3 per Xfinity race. All 5 of them take turns, and the pit reporters that aren't on the broadcast are usually pit reporting for an IndyCar race for NBC or IMSA race if there is one on the same day and/or weekend.
 Burns has also been a substitute play-by-play for standalone Xfinity Series races each year since 2015, but was not needed in that role in 2021 since there were no standalone races during NBC's part of the Xfinity Series schedule. The same goes for Leigh Diffey, who was not needed to commentate any NASCAR races in 2020, 2021 and 2022.

ARCA Menards Series East and West
 Charlie Krall (play-by-play)
 Adam Mackey (color commentator)
 Jessie Punch (pit reporter)
 Rick Allen (pre and post-race show host)

Note: Krall also commentated the pre and post-race shows himself at Dover and Irwindale in Rick Allen's absence.

Former commentators
 Allen Bestwick – play-by-play announcer (1999–2004), pit reporter (2005–2006)
 Ato Boldon – roving reporter (2017)
 Landon Cassill – fill-in Xfinity Series pit reporter (2018)
 Jac Collinsworth – pre-race show host/roving reporter (2021)
 Bob Costas – guest host for pre-race show at Cup race at Homestead only (2017)
 Lindsay Czarniak – fill-in pit reporter for standalone Busch Series races (2005–2006) Czarniak still works for NBC covering the Summer Olympics in 2021 and the Winter Olympics in 2022.
 Wally Dallenbach Jr. – color commentator (2001–2006) Dallenbach also returned to NBC for a cameo appearance on the pre-race show of the 2020 Cup Series race at the Daytona Road Course.
 Carl Edwards – color commentator for Xfinity Series race at Richmond only (2015)
 Ray Evernham – alternate Xfinity Series color commentator (2015)
 Brendan Gaughan – fill-in Xfinity Series pit reporter (2018)
 Joe Gibbs – color commentator (1999)
 Alex Hayden - fill-in pit reporter for standalone Xfinity Series races (2015–2016)
 Ned Jarrett – guest color commentator at Darlington only (2015–2017)
 Carolyn Manno – host of NASCAR Victory Lap (2014–2018). Manno still works for NBC, but is no longer a commentator for NASCAR.
 Mike Massaro – pit reporter (2015–2016)
 Jamie McMurray – color commentator for Xfinity Series race at Chicagoland only (2015)
 Jim Noble – fill-in pit reporter for standalone Xfinity Series races (2015–2016)
 Benny Parsons – color commentator (2000–2006)
 Dorsey Schroeder – pit reporter (1999)
 Ken Squier – guest play-by-play announcer at Darlington only (2015–2017)
 Frank Stoddard – alternate Xfinity Series color commentator (2015
 Danielle Trotta – host of NASCAR Victory Lap (2019)
 Brian Vickers – NASCAR America analyst and rotating/alternate pre/post-race show analyst (2015–2016)
 Krista Voda – host (2015–2020)
 Mike Wallace – color commentator (1999)
 Bill Weber – pre-race show host/pit reporter (2001–2004), pre-race show host/play-by-play announcer (2005–2006). Weber also filled-in for the injured Allen Bestwick as the play-by-play for the races at Talladega and Kansas in 2004.
 Brian Williams – host (1999)
 Matt Yocum – pit reporter (2001–2006)
 Kelli Stavast – pit reporter (2015–2021)

See also
 List of NASCAR on Fox broadcasters
 List of NASCAR on ESPN broadcasters

References

External links

NASCAR on NBC broadcasters
NBC